Fernandez Lewis "Frank" Ponds (born 1959) is a former United States Navy officer from the U.S. state of Alabama. He is the former commanding officer of the amphibious assault ship  and commanded the destroyer  in the early 2000s. He is also a former executive officer of the destroyer .

Early life and education
Ponds is originally from Autaugaville, Alabama and graduated from the University of Alabama in 1982 with a B.A. degree. He later earned an M.S. degree in military studies from the Marine Corps Command and Staff College, an M.S. degree in information systems technology from the George Washington University and an M.S. degree in national security strategy from the National Defense University.

Career

2000s

2003

2007-2009
In 2007, he took command of Amphibious Squadron EIGHT (embarked onboard ), receiving the honorary title of Commodore.  This period saw him engaged as Mission Commander of anti-piracy operations off the coast of Somalia; Operation Sea Angel II providing relief hurricane relief efforts in Bangladesh; and Operation Continuing Promise which included additional relief efforts in hurricane ravaged Haiti.

2010s

2015
In April 2015 his appointment as the fifteenth commandant of Joint Task Force Guantanamo was announced.

Ponds retired from the U.S. Navy in late 2015.

Awards and decorations
Ponds has been awarded the Defense Superior Service Medal, Legion of Merit (four), Meritorious Service Medal (five), Navy and Marine Corps Commendation Medal (three), and the Navy and Marine Corps Achievement Medal.

Personal life
Ponds is married and has two children.

References

External links

1959 births
Living people
Place of birth missing (living people)
People from Autauga County, Alabama
University of Alabama alumni
Military personnel from Alabama
African-American United States Navy personnel
Marine Corps University alumni
George Washington University alumni
National Defense University alumni
Recipients of the Meritorious Service Medal (United States)
Recipients of the Legion of Merit
United States Navy admirals
Recipients of the Defense Superior Service Medal